Neosilvanus is a genus of beetles in the family Silvanidae, containing the following species:

 Neosilvanus atratulus Grouvelle
 Neosilvanus levicollis Grouvelle

References

Silvanidae genera